The Tommy Tiernan Show is an Irish chat show presented by  Tommy Tiernan. It was first broadcast on RTÉ One on 5 January 2017. The first two series aired on Thursday evenings, with the third series moving to a Saturday evening slot. The premise of the show is that host Tommy Tiernan and the audience have no idea who the guests will be until they walk out onto the stage, with no pre-prepared questions or research being carried out.

Series

Episodes

Series 1 (2017)

Series 2 (2018)

Series 3 (2019)

Series 4 (2020)
10 episodes 
 Hozier, Mark Smith, Aisling Byrne and Paddy Holohan
 Brendan O'Carroll, Elizabeth Oakes, and Donna Zuma

Series 5 (2021)
16 episodes 
 Andrea Corr, Nicola Tallant and Darragh Carroll. Music was by Andrea Corr with the RTÉ Concert Orchestra.
 Sinéad Burke, Ian Robertson and Deirdre Robertson, Séamus and Breanndán Begly. Music was by Emma Langford.
 Brenda Fricker, Bashir Otukoya, and Senator David Norris.
 Mary Coughlan, Zak Moradi, and Senator Eileen Flynn.
 Baz Ashmawy, Jess Kavanagh, and Manchán Magan. Music was by Pillow Queens.
 Brian O'Driscoll, Stephen Rea and Judge Gillian Hussey. Music was by AE Mak.
 Dublin Zoo's Gerry Creighton, Dave Balfe/For Those I Love.
 Philomena Begley, Helen Behan, Chris "Big Bear" McNaghten. Music was by Muireann Nic Amhlaoibh, Gerry O'Beirne and Dónal O'Connor.
 Liam Cunningham, The 2 Johnnies, and Mary Reynolds. Music was by Daoirí Farrell and Dónal Lunny.
 Seán Boylan, Fionnghuala O'Reilly, and David Brophy.
 Joe Slattery, Eamon Dunphy, Lisa O'Neill, FeliSpeaks and Tolü Makay.
 Sinead Kane, Neven Maguire, and Mike Scott. Music by David O'Doherty and his father Jim Doherty.
 Rita Ann Higgins, Ardal O'Hanlon and Ciarán Bolger. Music was by Pugwash.

Series 6 (2022)

 A special episode aired on 27 December 2021
 Marie Cassidy, Killian Donnelly and Barry McGuigan.
 Gabriel Byrne, Davy FitzGerald, Santis O'Garro

Series 7 (2023)
Roy Keane, football analyst, and former international player
Martin Shaw (mythographer), storyteller and collector of myths
Roz Purcell, model and influencer
Donovan, singer-songwriter
Ken Doherty, former world champion snooker player
Dara Ó Briain, stand-up comedian

References

External links
 The Tommy Tiernan Show at RTE

2017 Irish television series debuts
Irish television talk shows
RTÉ original programming